Major-General Robert Harry Bertram Arkwright  & Bar (30 July 1903 – 14 November 1971) was a British Army officer who served in the Second World War and later commanded the 2nd Infantry Division.

Arkwright was born in Bickley, Kent, England, the son of Bertram Harry Godfrey Arkwright (1879–1949) and his wife Grace Emma Julia Hurt. Francis Arkwright was his younger brother.

Military career
After attending the Royal Military College, Sandhurst, Arkwright was commissioned into the 12th Royal Lancers on 31 January 1924.

He attended the Staff College, Camberley from 1934 to 1935.

He served in the Second World War, initially at the War Office as a General Staff Officer Grade 2 (GSO2), then as Deputy Assistant Adjutant General for 1st Armoured Division during the Battle of France, as a General Staff Officer with 8th Armoured Division and as Brigadier responsible for Armoured Fighting Vehicles in the British Eighth Army before being made Commander of 23rd Armoured Brigade in 1943. As Commander of the 23rd Armoured Brigade he took part in the Sicily landings, the Italy landings, both part of the Italian Campaign, and later the Civil War in Greece. After the war he became General Officer Commanding 2nd Infantry Division in 1946, Director of the Royal Armoured Corps in 1947 and General Officer Commanding 56th (London) Armoured Division in 1948. His last appointment was as General Officer Commanding 7th Armoured Division from 1949 until his retirement in 1951.

He lived at Pen y Bryn Hall in Montgomery.

Family
In 1927 he married Kathleen Gladys Hanbury.

References

External links
British Army Officers 1939−1945
Generals of World War II

|-

|-

1903 births
1971 deaths
War Office personnel in World War II
Graduates of the Royal Military College, Sandhurst
Graduates of the Staff College, Camberley
People of the Greek Civil War
British Army major generals
12th Royal Lancers officers
Companions of the Order of the Bath
Companions of the Distinguished Service Order
British Army brigadiers of World War II
People from Bickley
Military personnel from Kent